George W. Aguilar, Sr. (born 1930) is a Wasco resident of the Warm Springs Indian Reservation who won the 2006 Oregon Book Award for Creative Nonfiction for When the River Ran Wild! Indian Traditions on the Mid-Columbia and the Warm Springs Reservation.

References

Additional sources
   Oregon Voices: Telling the History of a Shattered Culture: An Interview with George W. Aguilar, Sr.
  Tribal Elder George Aguilar Sr. Is “First Count” in Oregon Census
  Kiksht Chinook elder tells about life as it was

1930 births
Living people
People from Wasco County, Oregon
Writers from Oregon
Date of birth missing (living people)